The 2013 World Sprint Speed Skating Championships is a long track speed skating event that was held on January 26–27, 2013, in the Utah Olympic Oval, in Salt Lake City, United States.

Rules 
All participating skaters are allowed to skate the two 500 meters and one 1000 meters; 24 skaters may take part on the second 1000 meters. These 24 skaters are determined by the samalog standings after the three skated distances, and comparing these lists as follows:

 Skaters among the top 24 on both lists are qualified.
 To make up a total of 24, skaters are then added in order of their best rank on either list.

Men championships

Sprint results 

NQ = Not qualified for the second 1000 m (only the best 24 are qualified)DQ = disqualified

Women championships

Sprint results 

NQ = Not qualified for the second 1000 m (only the best 24 are qualified)DQ = disqualified

References

External links
ISU website

World Sprint Speed Skating Championships, 2013
2013 World Sprint
World Sprint, 2013
Sports in Salt Lake City
World Sprint Speed Skating